Events in the year 2011 in Cape Verde.

Incumbents
President: 
 Pedro Pires
 Jorge Carlos Fonseca
Prime Minister: José Maria Neves

Events
Cape Verde signed the UN protocol, the Optional Protocol to the International Covenant on Economic, Social and Cultural Rights, also it ratified three conventions, the Convention on the Prevention and Punishment of the Crime of Genocide, the Optional Protocol to the Convention on the Elimination of All Forms of Discrimination against Women and the Convention on the Rights of Persons with Disabilities
 February 6: 2011 parliamentary elections took place
 March 11: The 5th José Maria Neves government began
 August 7–20: Cape Verdean presidential election took place in two rounds

Arts and entertainment
July 8: Criod ne São Cente, an album by Val Xalino was released

Sports

CS Mindelense won the Cape Verdean Football Championship

Deaths
Paula Fortes, independence activist (b. 1945)
December 11: Carlina Pereira, activist, politician and the second First Lady of Cape Verde (b. around 1926)
December 17: Cesária Évora (b. 1941), singer

References

 
Cape Verde
2010s in Cape Verde
Years of the 21st century in Cape Verde
Cape Verde